Cosmopterix diandra is a moth in the family Cosmopterigidae. It was described by John Frederick Gates Clarke in 1986. It is found on the Marquesas Islands.

References

Moths described in 1986
diandra